Abū al-Thanā’ Shihāb ad-Dīn Sayyid Maḥmūd ibn ‘Abd Allāh al-Ḥusaynī al-Ālūsī al-Baghdādī (‎; 10 December 1802 – 29 July 1854 CE) was an Iraqi Islamic scholar best known for writing Ruh al-Ma`ani, an exegesis (tafsir)  of the Qur'an.

Biography
He was born in Baghdad on the day of Jumu`ah, 14 Sha`ban 1217 AH (Friday, 10 December 1802).
 He died on 5 Dhul-Q'dah, 1270 AH (29 July 1854)

Works
An exhaustive list of all his works far to long and thus difficult to compile.  Indexes in the British Library and the Below are a few examples:

Rūḥ al-ma‘ānī fī tafsīr al-Qur’ān al-‘aẓīm wa-al-sab‘ al-mathānī
Nashwat al-shamūl fī al-safar ilā Islāmbūl
Nashwat al-mudām fī al-‘awd ilá Madīnat al-Salām
al-Ajwibah al-‘Irāqīyah ‘alá al-as’ilah al-Lāhūrīyah
al-Ajwibah al-‘Irāqīyah ‘an al-as’ilah al-Īrānīyah
Ghra'b al-'Ightirab
Daqaiq al-Tafsir
Sharh Sullam al-Mantiq
al-Tiraz al-Mudh-hab Fi Sharh Qasydat al-Baz al-Ash-hab
al-Maqamat al-Alousiya

Legacy
Left a legacy of five sons: Sayid Abdullah Bha'uldin Al-Alousi, Sayid Sa'd Abdulbaqi Al-Alousi, Abu Albrakat Sayid Nu'man Khayruldin Al-Alousi, Sayid Mohammad Hamid Afandi and Sayid Ahmed Shakir Afandi

References

1802 births
1854 deaths
Writers from Baghdad
Iraqi Sunni Muslim scholars of Islam
Quranic exegesis scholars
19th-century Arabs